Askar Khan Afshar was a Persia ambassador who was sent to Paris, during the period of the Franco-Persian alliance. He arrived in Paris on 20 July 1808 and met Napoleon on 4 September 1808 at Château de Saint-Cloud. He left in April 1810, as Persia in turn allied with Great Britain, then France's enemy in the Napoleonic Wars.

Askar Khan Afshar's posting in Paris partly coincided with that of the Ottoman Empire ambassador Muhib Efendi.

In 1817, Askar Khan was appointed to be a mehmandar i.e. an official guide of Russian embassy headed by general Yermolov.

Notes

Iranian diplomats
Ambassadors of Iran to France
19th-century Iranian politicians
People from Urmia